Cliff Walsh is a competitive shooter, ICORE World Revolver Champion and USPSA National Revolver Champion. He is also known for competing in the third season of History Channel's marksmen competition Top Shot.

Biography
He began shooting competitively in 2003, and became a member of the U.S. National IPSC Revolver team which won the 2005 IPSC Handgun World Shoot in Ecuador. He finished third at the 2006 Summer Blast competition. The next year, he finished second. Finally, in 2008, Walsh finished in first place after beating Mike Carmoney by more than 53 match points.

In 2009, Walsh beat Jerry Miculek for first place in the 2009 USPSA Nationals. This was the first time Miculek was beat at the Revolver Division. Walsh is also the fourth person to receive the USPSA revolver Grand Master classification.

Walsh has competed in IPSC competitions in Ecuador, Brazil, Norway, Czech Republic and Serbia. He was also selected for the U.S. National Team for the 2011 IPSC Handgun World Shoot in Greece.

In 2011, Walsh appeared in the third season of History Channel's marksmen competition Top Shot. During the first half of the competition, Walsh competed as part of the Red Team. His team ended up winning three challenges during his tenure, and Cliff was nominated for elimination three times. He was eliminated during the eighth week of the competition in a competition with a bow.

References

External links
Cliff Walsh Bio on History Channel
 

IPSC shooters
Living people
American male sport shooters
Sportspeople from Pinellas County, Florida
Year of birth missing (living people)